The 2010–11 Liga Nacional de Ascenso season is the thirteenth edition since its establishment in 1996. A total of 16 teams contest the league, 10 of which returned from the 2009 season, 1 of which was promoted from Copa Rommel Fernández, and 5 of which have been invited to participate as part of the league's expansion project.

Changes for the 2010–11 edition
The league increased the number of participating teams from 10 to 16. SUNTRACS earned its spot as champions of the 2010 edition of the Copa Rommel Fernández while 5 other teams from the Colón, Chiriquí, Chiriquí Occidente, Coclé, and Veraguas provincial leagues were invited to participate as part of the league's expansion project.
The teams were separated into 2 groups (Group A and Group B) containing 8 teams in each.
There will be no more promotion play-off in this edition, instead the overall champion (that is the Grand Champion or the winner of both the Apertura and Clausura) will be promoted directly. Additionally, the team with the worst record in the general standings of the Liga Panameña de Fútbol will be relegated directly.

Teams

Apertura 2010

Regular Round

Group A

Standings

Positions by round

Results

Group B

Standings

Positions by round

Results

Final round

Quarter-finals

Quarter-finals 1

Quarter-finals 2

Semifinals

Semifinals 1

Semifinals 2

The original match between Río Abajo and Colón C-3 was played on September 26 at 19:00 (UTC-5) at Cancha de Entrenamiento Luis Tapia, but it was suspended at the 65th minute by the referee Luis Rodríguez because of violence in the stands perpetuated by the team's supporters. At the time of the suspension, Río Abajo was winning 1-0 but the rematch was scheduled to start from 0.

Final

Awards

Top goalscorers

Most valuable player

Best goalkeeper

References

2006
2010–11 in Panamanian football leagues
Pan